Hopewell is an independent city surrounded by Prince George County and the Appomattox River in the Commonwealth of Virginia, United States. At the 2020 census, the population was 23,033. The Bureau of Economic Analysis combines the city of Hopewell with Prince George County for statistical purposes.

Hopewell is in the Tri-Cities area of the Richmond Metropolitan Statistical Area (MSA).

History

City Point 

The city was founded to take advantage of its site overlooking the James and Appomattox Rivers. City Point, the oldest part of Hopewell, was established in 1613 by Sir Thomas Dale. It was first known as "Bermuda City," which was changed to Charles City, lengthened to Charles City Point, and later abbreviated to City Point. (At this time, Bermuda, the Atlantic archipelago, was considered part of the Colony of Virginia and appeared on its maps.) Hopewell/City Point is the second oldest continuously inhabited English settlement in the United States after Hampton. Jamestown no longer is inhabited.

"Charles City Point" was in Charles City Shire when the first eight shires were established in the Colony of Virginia in 1634. Charles City Shire soon became known as Charles City County in 1637. In 1619 Samuel Sharpe and Samuel Jordan from City Point, then named Charles City, were burgesses at the first meeting of the House of Burgesses.

The burgesses separated an area of the county south of the river, including City Point, establishing it separately as Prince George County in 1703. City Point was an unincorporated town in Prince George County until the City of Hopewell annexed the Town of City Point in 1923.

During the American Civil War, Union General Ulysses S. Grant used City Point as his headquarters during the Siege of Petersburg in 1864 and 1865. Grant's headquarters, which President Lincoln visited, were located at Appomattox Manor, one of the three plantations of Richard Eppes, who cultivated wheat and other grains and held 130 slaves at the beginning of the war.

His property included most of the present day city of Hopewell and Eppes Island, a plantation across the James River from City Point. Richard Slaughter, a former slave of Eppes, escaped to a Union ship during the Civil War, as did all but 12 of Eppes' 130 slaves, choosing freedom. Slaughter recounted his life story for a Works Progress Administration interviewer in 1936.

The City Point Railroad, built in 1838 between City Point and Petersburg, was used as a critical part of the siege strategy. It is considered the oldest portion of the Norfolk and Western Railway, now a part of Norfolk Southern.

Hopewell Farm
Hopewell, part of the Eppes' plantation, was developed by DuPont Company in 1914 as Hopewell Farm, an incorporated area in Prince George County. DuPont first built a dynamite factory there, then switched to the manufacture of guncotton during World War I.

Nearly burned to the ground in the Hopewell Fire of 1915, the city prospered afterward and became known as the "Wonder City" as the village of Hopewell grew from a hamlet of 400 in 1916 to a city of more than 20,000 people in a few short months. Unlike most cities in Virginia, Hopewell was never incorporated as a town, but it was incorporated as an independent city in 1916.

After DuPont abandoned the city following World War I, moving its manufacturing facilities elsewhere and specializing in other products, Hopewell briefly became a ghost town until 1923 when Tubize Corporation established a plant on the old DuPont site. The same year, the city of Hopewell annexed the neighboring town of City Point, which enabled it to expand and thrive. The Tubize plant was later acquired by Firestone Tire and Rubber Company and was a major employer in Hopewell for decades. Allied Chemical and Dye Corporation and Hercules Chemical also established plants on portions of the old DuPont site.

20th century populace
As early as its incorporation, Hopewell was a city of industrious migrants. Immigrants from Bohemia (now the western lands of the Czech Republic), Italy, and Greece populated the city, working in factories and opening small businesses. Others migrated from other parts of Virginia and neighboring states of North Carolina and West Virginia to work in Hopewell's industries.

As was the case in most southern cities, African Americans in Hopewell were subject to Jim Crow segregation until the success of the Civil Rights Movement. The picturesque theater in the middle of town, the Beacon Theatre, only allowed Blacks in the balcony. In August 1966, the Ku Klux Klan confronted the Reverend Curtis Harris and other Black Hopewell citizens when they attempted to petition the city manager to find an alternate location for a landfill that was going to be opened in the middle of a Black neighborhood. Hopewell public schools were desegregated under court order in 1963, following Renee Patrice GILLIAM et al v. School Board of the City of Hopewell, Virginia.

1935 bus tragedy
Hopewell made national news when, on December 22, 1935, a bus plunged through the open draw of the Appomattox River Drawbridge on State Route 10 just outside Hopewell's city limits. Only one of the 15 occupants of the bus survived. The modern twin spans of the Charles Hardaway Marks Bridges were built to replace that bridge and cross the river nearby.

Urban renewal
Like many cities, Hopewell embarked on an urban renewal plan in the 1960s in an attempt to revitalize its downtown retail area. The plan was a failure because many of the retail businesses that had been located downtown moved elsewhere to new shopping centers being developed outside the city limits in Petersburg, Chester, and Prince George County. With the exception of a new branch bank and a Hardee's fast food restaurant constructed in the late 1970s, the former downtown area that was razed for redevelopment remained a vast gravel parking lot for decades.

However, a new urbanization is occurring and many long vacant storefronts are now refurbished and occupied. Several others are now under construction. Further, the City invested $12 million in a new beautiful state of the art flagship library for the busy Appomattox Regional Library System, the Maude Langhorne Nelson Library. The library has a cyber cafe, extensive YA and children's collections, and a replica of the historic, 1600s-era frigate ship, Hopewell, installed as a centerpiece. The city also restored the Beacon Theatre, which was built in 1928, and there are 70 or more concerts and other events annually. Performers there include The Temptations, The Four Tops, Vince Gill, Travis Tritt, Clint Black, Amy Grant, Average White Band, Vanilla Ice, The Commodores, Pure Prairie League, Delbert McClinton, and many more.

New plantings and street beautification projects have been put into place, to attract more businesses and shoppers to the East Broadway area.

Toxic waste dumping ground

Hopewell is located at the confluence of the Appomattox and James rivers. The James River has suffered from serious water pollution problems attributable to chemical dumping; Kepone insecticide (manufactured in Hopewell from 1966–1975) was dumped in the river by the pesticide's manufacturer Allied Signal and subcontractor LifeSciences Product Company. The LifeSciences facility in Hopewell was the world's only manufacturer of Kepone, producing up to 6,000 pounds daily. Although closely related to the toxic pesticide DDT, which was banned in the U.S. in 1972 because of the dangers it presents to humans and wildlife, Kepone was not federally regulated until after the Hopewell disaster, in which 29 factory workers were hospitalized with various ailments. In 1975, the state health department shut down the facility, and fishing in the James River from Richmond to the Chesapeake Bay was banned due to contamination concerns.

Kepone is cited amongst a handful of other noxious substances as the driver for Gerald Ford's half-hearted approval of the Toxic Substances Control Act, which "remains one of the most controversial regulatory bills ever passed". Since the discovery of the Kepone disaster in 1975, the water quality has improved, and the fishing ban was lifted after 13 years. In 2019, after years of planning, the city opened a "Riverwalk" boardwalk, seeking to use scenic views and water access as part of overall economic redevelopment efforts. Bass and catfish are now routinely fished at a Hopewell marina.

Hopewell is the location of several large chemical plants owned by the Honeywell Corporation, Ashland, Evonik Industries, as well as a Green Plains Inc. ethanol plant and paper mill owned by WestRock.

Recent history
The Federal Correctional Complex, Petersburg (FCC Petersburg), two federal prisons which house 3400 inmates, are located just outside the Hopewell city limits, in Prince George County

In 1977, Hopewell again made the national news due to another accident involving a drawbridge when the tanker S.S. Marine Floridian outbound under the command of a James River pilot suffered a steering malfunction just after dawn on February 24 that caused it to veer out of the channel and hit the Benjamin Harrison Memorial Bridge just east of town.  The accident caused serious damage to the bridge and it was closed for months.

In 1983, Hopewell again received negative publicity from the national news media when it was discovered that Evelyn Rust Wells, an elderly woman, had been held captive and terrorized in her home in the City Point section. Her captors, mostly male teenagers under 18, cashed her Social Security checks at local grocery stores. A local grocer noted a change in purchases from when neighborhood kids assisted Wells, and called the police. They investigated and freed Wells who was by then severely malnourished.

Although still an important industrial city, Hopewell has struggled with transitions through loss of jobs due to plant closures, changes in residential housing patterns, and the costs of environmental clean-up. Much of its middle class population moved to neighboring Prince George and Chesterfield Counties for newer housing during the suburban expansion of the 1960s and 1970s. The city's housing stock is dominated by relatively small homes with a significant percentage being offered as rental properties. Of these, many were hastily constructed over a century ago by DuPont to house plant workers during the First World War.

Hopewell has encouraged re-development along its waterfront areas along the James and Appomattox Rivers, in the downtown area, and the City Point Historic District, as well as the sites of several long vacant industrial plants. Due to its hasty construction as a mill town during the First World War, Hopewell had a large number of kit homes that were hauled in and erected in neighborhoods laid out by DuPont known as "A Village" and "B Village".  The city has a surviving group of Sears Catalog Homes, with several available for exterior viewing on a self-guided tour. The city also has numerous Aladdin Kit Homes; at one time, it may have had the most such homes in the nation. Because residents moved to newer houses and the Aladdin Homes were abandoned and deteriorated, many have been razed. 

Hopewell has struggled with high rates of violent crime.

In September 2010, a series of explosions occurred at a controversial new ethanol plant that had recently been constructed on a long vacant site formerly occupied by a Firestone plant. In 2007, former Hopewell mayor and civil rights leader Curtis W. Harris, had marched against the proposed ethanol plant being built in Hopewell with support from the national Southern Christian Leadership Conference.  The plant had not yet become fully operational when the explosions occurred.  There was no loss of life due to the accident but shortly after the explosion Osage BioEnergy, the owners of the $150 million facility, announced that the plant was for sale.  Although the facility was sitting idle through 2013 with the city of Hopewell taking legal action to recoup unpaid taxes on the property, the facility was eventually purchased by another firm and operations were restarted in 2014. In 2015 the troubled ethanol plant closed again for a second time after less than a year in operation with its owners citing a lack of profitability as the reason for the shutdown. The plant has since been purchased and re-opened by Green Plains Inc. of Omaha, Nebraska.

Hopewell has come to the attention of AAA because some of its members have complained that Hopewell is a speed trap for its practice of citing drivers for speeding along a 1.7 mile stretch of Interstate 295, nicknamed the "Million Dollar Mile" by disgruntled drivers. AAA, claimed in a press release that Hopewell employs 11 sheriff's deputies working in 14-hour shifts to patrol less than two miles of the highway that lie within the city limits of Hopewell.  However, this statistic has been denied by the sheriff of Hopewell, who was baffled as to where that information was generated as he said the deputies working on I-295 only work eight-hour shifts. This practice, which it has been claimed, annually generated $1.8 million in revenue from speeding tickets, of which 75% were issued to out of state drivers, triggered a court clash between the Commonwealth's Attorney and the city prosecutor, and elicited an official ruling from the Attorney General of Virginia. Sheriff Luther Sodat said that the almost two-mile stretch of highway "is a safety issue for Hopewell." Virginia's urban interstates have a fatality rate about one-third the Statewide rate for all roads combined.

Geography

Climate

Neighborhoods
 City Point – annexed in 1923
 City Point National Cemetery

Adjacent counties
 Chesterfield County, Virginia - north
 Prince George County, Virginia - east, south, west
 Charles City County, Virginia - northeast

National protected area
 Petersburg National Battlefield Park (part)

Demographics

2020 census

Note: the US census treats Hispanic/Latino as an ethnic category. This table excludes Latinos from the racial categories and assigns them to a separate category. Hispanics/Latinos can be of any race.

2000 census
As of the census of 2000, there were 22,354 people, 9,055 households, and 6,075 families residing in the city. The population density was 2,182.3 people per square mile (842.9/km2). There were 9,749 housing units at an average density of 951.7 per square mile (367.6/km2). The racial makeup of the city was 47.1% White, 43.5% Black, 0.8% Asian, 0.4% Native American, 0.1% Pacific Islander, 1.2% from other races, and 1.8% from two or more races. 3.7% of the population were Hispanic or Latino of any race.

There were 9,055 households, out of which 32.1% had children under the age of 18 living with them, 40.6% were married couples living together, 21.2% had a female householder with no husband present, and 32.9% were non-families. 27.6% of all households were made up of individuals, and 11.2% had someone living alone who was 65 years of age or older. The average household size was 2.43 and the average family size was 2.94.

The age of the population was spread out, with 26.7% under the age of 18, 9.1% from 18 to 24, 28.6% from 25 to 44, 21.0% from 45 to 64, and 14.6% who were 65 years of age or older. The median age was 35 years. For every 100 females, there were 87.7 males. For every 100 women aged 18 and over, there were 82.2 men.

The median income for a household in the city was $39,156, and the median income for a family was $49,730. Males had a median income of $34,849 versus $25,401 for females. The per capita income for the city was $21,041. About 15.8% of families and 17.73% of the population were below the poverty line, including 21.6% of those under age 18 and 10.4% of those age 65 or over.

Education
The following are schools in the Hopewell, Virginia school division.

High school
 Hopewell High School

Middle school
 Carter G. Woodson School

Elementary schools
 Dupont Elementary School
 Harry E. James Elementary School
 Patrick Copeland Elementary School

All of the schools above are accredited by the Virginia Board of Education and by the Southern Association of Colleges and Schools.

Charter and technology
 Appomattox Regional Governor's School for the Arts And Technology Petersburg, VA, Open to students entering the 9th grade, with approval of passing through the admittance process.

Libraries
Appomattox Regional Library serves as the library system for Hopewell, Virginia.

Notable people

 Nelson Barclift, choreographer and dancer, was born in Hopewell.
 Sam Bass, artist, graduated from Hopewell High School.
 Robert Bolling, American settler and planter, and his wife, Jane Rolfe, lived at Kippax Plantation, in what was then Prince George County, in the 17th century.
 Samuel Face, American inventor, was born in City Point.
 Peter Francisco, soldier in the American Revolutionary War, found abandoned on the docks at City Point
 William Haines, actor and interior designer, ran a dance hall in Hopewell in 1914 while in his early teens.
 Curtis W. Harris, minister, civil rights activist, 1st African-American mayor of Hopewell
 Steven R. Taylor, Politician, was a previous mayor of Hopewell
 Dorothiea Hundley (aka Seka), adult film actress, attended Hopewell High School.
 Charles Hardaway Marks, Virginia politician, was born in Hopewell.
 Joey Peppersack, Paralympic swimmer, represented United States at 2020 Paralympic Games
 Monsanto Pope, former defensive tackle for the Denver Broncos
 Rebecca Beach Smith, Chief Judge of the United States District Court for the Eastern District of Virginia
 Darrell Taylor, 2nd round pick to the Seattle Seahawks in the 2020 NFL Draft.
 TreVeyon Henderson, current Ohio State University running back.

Media
The Hopewell News, locally managed and operated by HPC Media, was an 8,000 circulation twice-weekly newspaper that covers local news, sports and events of interest to the communities of Hopewell, Enon and Prince George.  For more than 90 years, The Hopewell News served the greater Hopewell and Prince George communities. The paper was shut down on January 18, 2018. HPC Media also published the News-Patriot newspaper covering Colonial Heights and communities in Southeastern Chesterfield County.

Climate
The climate in this area is characterized by hot, humid summers and generally mild to cool winters.  According to the Köppen Climate Classification system, Hopewell has a humid subtropical climate, abbreviated "Cfa" on climate maps.

Gallery

Politics

See also
 National Register of Historic Places listings in Hopewell, Virginia

References

External links
 City of Hopewell

Further reading 
 

 
Cities in Virginia
Populated places on the James River (Virginia)
Greater Richmond Region
Majority-minority counties and independent cities in Virginia